Alkalihalobacillus urbisdiaboli is a rod-shaped, endospore-forming and facultative anaerobic bacterium from the genus of Alkalihalobacillus which has been isolated from soil from Devil City in China.

References

Bacillaceae
Bacteria described in 2019